Don't Cry Out Loud is the title of the seventh album by Melissa Manchester. It was released by Arista Records in October 1978.

Background
Most of the album's tracks were recorded with Leon Ware producing; Ware had expressed an interest in recording Manchester based on the singer's version of the Ware composition "I Wanna Be Where You Are" featured on the 1977 album release Singin'.... The tracks Manchester recorded with Ware intended as the singer's 1978 album release - which Manchester planned to name Caravan - were all original material except "Bad Weather", a Stevie Wonder composition which had been a single for The Supremes in 1973.

According to Arista president Clive Davis upon hearing the Caravan tracks he felt the album as planned would not afford Manchester the Top 40 hit required to revive her career and at Davis' strong suggestion Manchester recorded the Peter Allen and Carole Bayer Sager composition "Don't Cry Out Loud" with Harry Maslin producing. Manchester has stated that in fact the idea of recording "Don't Cry Out Loud" was her own, although she had anticipated recording it in the intimate manner evinced by its writer Peter Allen on his recorded version, and was surprised by the bombastic arrangement used for her recording. The addition of the new track "Don't Cry Out Loud" to the album necessitated the dropping of the  track "We Had This Time"  an apparently one-off songwriting collaboration of Manchester and Larry Weiss - which was utilized as the B-side of the "Don't Cry Out Loud" single: "We Had This Time" would also be recorded by Dionne Warwick for her 1980 album No Night So Long.

With the addition of the "Don't Cry Out Loud" track, Manchester's album was released in October 1978 with "Don't Cry Out Loud" issued as a single; the album was renamed for the single despite Manchester's desire to retain the title Caravan. "Don't Cry Out Loud" did indeed return Manchester to the Top 40 in fact attaining a #10 peak in March 1979 in its twentieth week on the Billboard Hot 100; the single's popularity was paralleled by the ascent of the Don't Cry Out Loud album to #33.

Rather than release a second A-side single from the Don't Cry Out Loud album, Arista attempted to follow up the success of the "Don't Cry Out Loud" single with "Through the Eyes of Love", the theme song from the movie Ice Castles; the track, for which "Such a Morning" from the Don't Cry Out Loud album served as B-side, failed to consolidate Manchester's comeback, peaking at #76. "Through the Eyes of Love" would be included as a bonus track on the CD re-release of the Don't Cry Out Loud album, as would the B-side of the "Don't Cry Out Loud" single: "We Had This Time".

Track listing

Charts

Personnel
 Melissa Manchester – lead vocals, acoustic piano (2, 6, 10)
 Greg Phillinganes – electric piano (1, 2, 4, 5, 7–10)
 Richard Tee – acoustic piano (1, 4, 5, 7, 9, 10)
 Bill Payne – acoustic piano (3)
 Michael Boddicker – synthesizer (5), sound string equalizer (8)
 Reginald "Sonny" Burke  – synthesizer (5)
 David T. Walker – electric guitar (1, 2, 4, 5, 7, 9, 10)
 Lee Ritenour – guitar (2-5, 8, 9)
 Dennis Budimir – guitar (3)
 Jay Graydon – guitar (10)
 Chuck Rainey – bass (1, 2, 4, 5, 7–10)
 David Hungate – bass (3)
 James Gadson – drums (1, 2, 4, 5, 7, 9), electronic drums (1, 2), backing vocals (9)
 Jim Keltner – drums (3)
 Art Rodriguez – drums (8), electronic drums (8)
 Ed Greene – drums (10)
 Lenny Castro – percussion (1, 2, 4, 7–10), birds (8)
 Tommy Morgan – harmonica (7)
 David Luell – baritone saxophone (5), tenor saxophone (5)
 Mike Carnahan – tenor saxophone (5)
 Tom Saviano – horn arrangements (1, 4, 5), rhythm arrangements (1, 2, 4, 7, 8, 10), alto saxophone (5), tenor saxophone (5)
Dick Hyde – trombone (5)
 Lew McCreary – trombone (5)
 Chuck Findley – trumpet (5)
 Steve Madaio – trumpet (5)
 Gene Page – string arrangements (1, 4, 7, 10)
 David Blumberg – string arrangements (2, 6); rhythm, string and woodwind arrangements (9)
 Barry Fasman – arrangements (3)
 Harry Bluestone – concertmaster (1-4, 6, 7, 10), violin solo (2)
 Frank DeCaro – conductor (1-4, 6, 7, 10)
 Leon Ware – backing vocals (1, 2, 5, 9), rhythm arrangements (7, 9)
 Claudia Cagan – backing vocals (5)

Production
 Producers – Leon Ware (Tracks 1, 2 & 4–10); Harry Maslin (Track 3).
 Engineers – Milt Calise, Harry Maslin, Gary Skardina, Gary Starr and Steve Waldman.
 Recorded at A&M Studios, Allen Zentz Recording and Music Grinder Studios (Hollywood, CA); The Village Recorder (Los Angeles, CA).
 Mixed by Phil Schier at Record Plant (Los Angeles, CA).
 Edited and Mastered by Jo Hansch at Kendun Recorders (Burbank, CA).
 Production Coordinator – Pam Bishop 
 Music Coordinator – Carol Cassano
 Cover Coordinator – Kay Steele 
 Art Direction and Design – John Kosh
 Photography – David Alexander

References

1978 albums
Arista Records albums
Melissa Manchester albums
Albums arranged by Gene Page
Albums produced by Leon Ware